Daddy (1989) is a television film made for Doordarshan. Directed by Mahesh Bhatt, this film marked the acting debut of his daughter Pooja Bhatt. The film boasts spectacular performances by its lead actors Anupam Kher and Manohar Singh. It features a famous ghazal "Aaina mujhse meri pehli si surat maange" sung by Talat Aziz. Coincidentally, Talat Aziz was offered a movie Dhun which was directed by Mahesh Bhatt. However, the movie has not been released to date.

Synopsis
This movie begins with an image of star, Anand Sarin (Anupam Kher). Slowly as the story progresses, more facts about the reason for his alcoholism come to light, and he is able to overcome them eventually with the help of Pooja's love and her support.

Cast
 Anupam Kher as Anand
 Manohar Singh as Kantaprasad
 Pooja Bhatt as Pooja
 Soni Razdan as Priya
 Sulbha Arya as Tarabai
 Neena Gupta as Vimla
 Avtar Gill
 Suhas Joshi as Mrs. Kantaprasad
 Raj Zutshi as Nikhil

Production
Mahesh Bhatt changed the climax of the film just a day before it was shot. Bhatt himself was struggling with alcoholism while shooting this well-received film.

A theatrical adaptation of Daddy, directed by Dinesh Gautam, was first staged in 2015 with Imran Zahid in the lead role. It was a rare Indian production staged at an international theatre festival in Pakistan in 2015, although the staging was delayed because of visa hassles.

Awards
 1991 - Filmfare Critics Award for Best Performance: Anupam Kher
 1991 - Filmfare Best Dialogue Award: Surah Sanim
 1991 - Filmfare Award for Lux New Face of the Year: Pooja Bhatt
 1989 - National Film Award - Special Jury Award: Anupam Kher.

References

External links
 

1980s Hindi-language films
1989 films
Films directed by Mahesh Bhatt
Doordarshan television films